was a Japanese voice actor.

Filmography

Television animation
1960s
Gigantor (1963) – Narrator
Ōgon Bat (1967) – Narrator
Yōkai Ningen Bem (1968) – Narrator
1970s
Science Ninja Team Gatchaman (1972) – A detective
Doraemon (1973) – Papa
Brave Raideen (1975) – Professor Steam
Gaiking (1975) – Namura
Blocker Gundan 4 Machine Blaster (1976) – Yoshitarō Harao
Nobody's Boy: Remi (1977-1978) - Policeman (episode 10)
Paul's Miraculous Adventure (1977) – Gabriel
Angie Girl (1978) – Johann
1980s
Astro Boy (1980) – Professor Ikisugi
Invincible Robo Trider G7 (1980) – Tetsuo Atsui
Ninja Hattori-kun (1981) – Kentarō Mitsuba
Ginga Hyōryū Vifam 13 (1983) – Frederick Roden
Magical Fairy Persia (1984) –  Goken Muroi
Princess Sarah (1985) –  Mr. Barrow
Mister Ajikko (1987) – Ajiō-sama
Zillion (1987) – Gord
Legend of Heavenly Sphere Shurato (1989) – Yūtarō Hidaka
1990s
Armored Police Metal Jack (1991) – Megadeath
Oishinbo (1991) – Takehara
Mobile Suit Gundam Wing (1995) – Professor G
After War Gundam X (1996) – Fong Alternative
Detective Conan (1996) – Tani, Ōyama, Yabuuchi, Murakami, etc.
Gasaraki (1998) – Giichirō Gōwa
The Big O (1999) – Santa Claus
Wild Arms: Twilight Venom (1999) – Kojima
2000s
Hiwou War Chronicles (2000) – Nagai
Samurai Girl: Real Bout High School (2001) – Tessai Onizuka
Inuyasha (2001) – Mushin
Ghost in the Shell: Stand Alone Complex (2002) – Kunihiko Nibu
Croket! (2003) – Kusamochi
Monster (2004) – Robbie
Kenichi: The Mightiest Disciple (2007) – Hayato Fūrinji (2nd voice)
Moyasimon: Tales of Agriculture (2007) – Kikuji Hiyoshi
Hell Girl (2009) – Kadokura
2010s
Dance in the Vampire Bund (2010) – Juneau Dermailles
Inazuma Eleven (2010) – Daisuke Endō
Katanagatari (2010) – Masatsuna Yanari
Little Battlers Experience (2011) – Cillian Kaidō
Garo: The Animation (2015) – Lara's grandfather

OVA
Konpeki no Kantai (1993) – Yasaburo Otaka
Please Save My Earth (1993) – Raozo Matsudaira
Sohryuden: Legend of the Dragon Kings (1993) – Chiyou
Iria: Zeiram the Animation (1994) – Dr. Touka
Mobile Suit Gundam: The 08th MS Team (1996) – Kojima
Sonic the Hedgehog (1996) – The President
Apocalypse Zero (1996) - Tomohisa, Narrator

Theatrical animation
Mobile Suit Gundam (1981) – Degwin Sodo Zabi
Doraemon: Nobita and the Kingdom of Clouds (1992) - Resentative
Pom Poko (1994) – Mizuki
Case Closed: The Phantom of Baker Street (2002) – Colonel Moran
Inuyasha the Movie: The Castle Beyond the Looking Glass (2002) – Mushin
Appleseed (2004) – Edward Uranus III
Pokémon: Arceus and the Jewel of Life (2009) – Tapp
Doraemon: Nobita and the Island of Miracles—Animal Adventure (2012) – Ouro

Video games
Gihren no Yabou (1998) – Degwin Sodo Zabi
Metal Gear Solid (1998) – Kenneth Baker
Metal Gear Solid 2: Sons of Liberty (2001) – President James Johnson
Harukanaru Toki no Naka de 3 (2004) – Emperor Go-Shirakawa
Super Robot Wars GC (2004) – Tetsuo Atsui, Great Dorumen
Killzone 3 (2011) – Orlock

Dubbing

Live-action
James Earl Jones
Coming to America – King Jaffe Joffer
The Ambulance (1992 TV Tokyo edition) – Lt. Frank Spencer
The Hunt for Red October (1993 TBS and 1999 TV Asahi editions) – Vice Admiral James Greer
Patriot Games (1999 TV Asahi edition) – Vice Admiral Jim Greer
The Sandlot – Mr. Mertle
Sommersby – Judge Barry Conrad Isaacs
Clear and Present Danger (1997 TV Asahi edition) – Vice Admiral Jim Greer
Pat Hingle
Batman (1995 TV Asahi edition) – James Gordon
Batman Returns (1994 TV Asahi edition) – James Gordon
Batman Forever (1998 TV Asahi edition) – James Gordon
The Quick and the Dead (1997 TV Asahi edition) – Horace
Batman & Robin (2000 TV Asahi edition) – James Gordon
Philip Baker Hall
The Rock (1999 NTV edition) – Chief Justice
Boogie Nights – Floyd Gondolli
Rush Hour – Captain William Diel
The Sum of All Fears – David Becker
Mr. Popper's Penguins – Mr. Franklin
George Kennedy
The Dirty Dozen – Maj. Max Armbruster
Creepshow 2 (1989 TV Tokyo edition) – Ray Spruce
The Naked Gun 2½: The Smell of Fear – Captain Ed Hocken
Naked Gun : The Final Insult – Captain Ed Hocken
Ned Beatty
Hostage Flight – Art Hofstadter 
Rudy – Daniel Ruettiger, Sr.
Just Cause (1997 TV Tokyo edition) – McNair
He Got Game – Warden Wyatt
The Absent-Minded Professor – Alonzo P. Hawk (Keenan Wynn)
Alcatraz – Raymond "Ray" Archer (Robert Forster)
Bad Girls – Frank Jarrett (Robert Loggia)
A Better Tomorrow – Father Sung (Tien Feng)
Bill & Ted's Bogus Journey – Rufus (George Carlin)
The Bourne Identity – Nykwana Wombosi (Adewale Akinnuoye-Agbaje)
Broken Embraces – Ernesto Martel (José Luis Gómez)
Captain America – General Fleming (Darren McGavin)
Changing Lanes – Stephen Delano (Sydney Pollack)
Con Air (2000 TV Asahi edition) – Guard Falzon (Steve Eastin)
Crimson Tide – Vladimir Radchenko (Daniel von Bargen)
The Da Vinci Code – Jacques Saunière (Jean-Pierre Marielle)
Deuce Bigalow: Male Gigolo – Robert Bigalow (Richard Riehle)
Die Hard (1992 Fuji TV edition) – Joseph Yoshinobu Takagi (James Shigeta)
Down with Love – Theodore Banner (Tony Randall)
Dr. Dolittle 3 – Jud Jones (John Amos)
Dr. No – M (Bernard Lee)
The Empire Strikes Back – Admiral Ackbar
Evilspeak (1986 TBS edition) – Sarge (R. G. Armstrong)
The Fast and the Furious (2005 TV Asahi edition) – Bilkins (Thom Barry)
2 Fast 2 Furious (2006 TV Asahi edition) – Bilkins (Thom Barry)
Firelight – Lord Clare (Joss Ackland)
The Golden Compass – High Councilor (Christopher Lee)
Goldfinger (2006 DVD edition) – M (Bernard Lee)
Guilty by Suspicion – Chairman Wood (Gailard Sartain)
Harlem Nights – Bennie Wilson (Redd Foxx)
The Hunt for Red October – Captain 2nd Rank Viktor Tupolev (Stellan Skarsgård)
Insomnia – Chief Charlie Nyback (Paul Dooley)
Jungle 2 Jungle – Alexei Jovanovic (David Ogden Stiers)
Keeping the Faith – Rabbi Ben Lewis (Eli Wallach)
Kiss of the Dragon – Uncle Tai (Burt Kwouk)
Lock, Stock and Two Smoking Barrels – Barry "the Baptist" (Lenny McLean)
Men of Honor – Mr. Pappy (Hal Holbrook)
Miracles – Uncle Hoi (Wu Ma)
My Favorite Martian – Mr. Channing (Michael Lerner)
The NeverEnding Story (1987 TV Asahi edition) – Carl Conrad Coreander (Thomas Hill)
The New Daughter – Roger Wayne (James Gammon)
Red Dawn – Jack Mason (Ben Johnson)
Return of the Jedi – Admiral Ackbar
Snatch – Doug the Head (Mike Reid)
Star Wars: The Force Awakens – Admiral Ackbar
Superman IV: The Quest for Peace – Lex Luthor (Gene Hackman)
Surrogates – Dr. Lionel Canter (James Cromwell)
The Thirteenth Floor – Hannon Fuller, Grierson (Armin Mueller-Stahl)
The Untouchables – Chief Mike Dorsett (Richard Bradford)
Wild Wild West (2002 NTV edition) – General 'Bloodbath' McGrath (Ted Levine)
Win Win – Leo Poplar (Burt Young)

Animation
Atomic Betty – Admiral DeGill
Babar – Cornelius
The Boondocks – Robert Jebediah Freeman
Chip 'n Dale Rescue Rangers – Monterey Jack
Oliver & Company – Winston
The Rescuers – Mr. Snoops
The Secret of NIMH – The Great Owl

Other voices
Star Tours – The Adventures Continue at Tokyo Disneyland – Admiral Ackbar

References

External links
Official profile 

1935 births
2019 deaths
81 Produce voice actors
Japanese male voice actors
Male voice actors from Tokyo